Joseph Jean Étienne Stanislas Cattarinich (November 13, 1881 – December 7, 1938), was a Canadian professional Ice hockey player, and co-owner of horse racing tracks in Canada and the United States as well as a co-owner of the Montreal Canadiens of the National Hockey League.

Biography
Joseph Cattarinich's father was a Croatian sailor. Cattarinich was originally spelt Katarinic, and other immediate surnames in the family tree included Bradicic and Nikolic. He went to sea with fellow Croats Zaninovich, Soussich and Lukinovilch. He visited Greenland and Russian islands with them and others.

Sports career
Cattarinich grew up in Quebec City and played ice hockey and lacrosse as a young man. Later, he lived in Levis near Quebec City. He is best known as the first goaltender of the professional Montreal Canadiens, then known as 'Les Canadiens', playing for the team during the inaugural 1910 National Hockey Association (NHA) season. He retired after Georges Vézina shut out Cattarinich's club in a game with Vézina's amateur Chicoutimi team (the Canadiens had been on a pre-season barnstorming tour to promote the upcoming season of the NHA. He was so impressed, that he recommended the Canadiens sign Vézina, and voluntarily stepped down from his place on the team. In those days ice hockey teams carried only one goaltender, as a rule.

Business career
With longtime business partner Leo Dandurand, Cattarinich became prominent in the Montreal tobacco wholesaling business, but it was their popularization of the Parimutuel betting system at local tracks that provided their greatest commercial success. With the re-introduction of race track betting in the United States after World War I, the pair, known popularly as "Catta-Léo", extended their activities to racetracks in Chicago, Jefferson Parish, Louisiana, New Orleans, and others in St. Louis and further afield.

In 1921, along with Dandurand and Louis Letourneau, Cattarinich purchased the Montreal Canadiens of the  National Hockey League from the estate of George Kennedy for $11,000. Although Dandurand was the active partner during their tenure (Cattarinich was known as "The Silent One" and Letourneau sold his stake in 1930), the Canadiens won three Stanley Cups with players such as Howie Morenz, Aurel Joliat, and Georges Vezina.  After a series of losses (amounting to $40,000 for the 1934–35 season alone), Cattarinich and Dandurand sold the club to a syndicate comprising J. Ernest Savard, Maurice Forget, and Louis Gélinas in 1935 for $165,000.

In 1932, Cattarinich, Dandurand, and Letourneau purchased Blue Bonnets Raceway. A shareholder with Robert S. Eddy, Jr. and others in Arlington Park racetrack in Chicago and Jefferson Park Racetrack in Jefferson Parish, Louisiana, in 1934 their group purchased the Fair Grounds Race Course in New Orleans from prominent horseman Edward R. Bradley. Cattarinich and Dandurand continued their betting business throughout the challenging economic environment of the Great Depression in the 1930s. Despite several attempts, they did not succeed in acquiring another NHL club.

While recovering from an eye operation, he suffered a heart attack and died on December 7, 1938 in New Orleans. Catarinich is buried in Notre-Dame-des-Neiges Cemetery in Montreal, Quebec.

He is a member of the Hockey Hall of Fame, inducted in 1977 as a builder.

References

External links
 

1881 births
1938 deaths
Canadian ice hockey coaches
Canadian ice hockey goaltenders
Canadian people of Croatian descent
Hockey Hall of Fame inductees
Ice hockey people from Quebec City
Montreal Canadiens (NHA) players
Montreal Canadiens coaches
Montreal Canadiens executives
National Hockey League executives
National Hockey League owners
Burials at Notre Dame des Neiges Cemetery
People from Lévis, Quebec
Stanley Cup champions